Aleksandr Spiridonovich Kanaki (29 March 1912 – 1995) was a Soviet athlete. He initially competed in decathlon and placed third at the 1936 Soviet Championships. During World War II his right hand was irreversibly injured in action. Hence after the war Kanaki changed to hammer throw, where his handicap was less impeding than in other throwing events. He set multiple records in hammer throw in the late 1940s and placed fifth at the 1950 European Championships.

References

1912 births
1995 deaths
People from Simferopolsky Uyezd
Honoured Masters of Sport of the USSR
Recipients of the Order of the Red Banner of Labour
Recipients of the Order of the Red Star
Soviet Athletics Championships winners
Soviet decathletes
Soviet male discus throwers
Soviet male hammer throwers
Soviet male hurdlers
Soviet male shot putters